The Hawthorne Asylum is a food cart pod in southeast Portland, Oregon, United States. There are more than 20 carts, as of April 2021. The pod also has picnic tables and fire pits.

History

The pod opened in February 2019. Approximately a dozen carts were burglarized in January 2021.

Vendors have included:
 Bark City BBQ
 Black Dagger PDX
 Montage ala Cart
 Tall Boy Fish and Chips

Reception
Pete Cottell of Willamette Week wrote, "Named after a 19th-century hospital for the mentally ill, the pod looks like what might happen if Tim Burton were commissioned to design a Portland-themed section of Disneyland."

References

External links

 

2019 establishments in Oregon
Buckman, Portland, Oregon
Food carts in Portland, Oregon